Google Fi (pronounced ), formerly Project Fi, is an MVNO telecommunications service by Google that provides telephone calls, SMS, and mobile broadband using cellular networks and Wi-Fi. Google Fi uses the T-Mobile network.  Google Fi is a service for US residents only, as of late 2019.

The service was launched for the Nexus 6, by invitation only, on April 22, 2015. The service was opened to the public on March 7, 2016, and support for additional devices, including the Pixel and Pixel XL smartphones, was introduced on October 4, 2016. On November 28, 2018, Google rebranded Project Fi as Google Fi and added support for more phones, including partial support for iPhones.

History 
Google Fi was announced exclusively for the Nexus 6 smartphone on April 22, 2015, with support for Sprint and T-Mobile. Due to high demand at launch, the service required that users receive invitations, which were gradually released throughout summer 2015. The invitation system was dropped on March 7, 2016. U.S. Cellular was added on June 8, 2016. Three was added on July 12, 2016. In October 2016, Google added support for the Pixel and Pixel XL smartphones, and later introduced a Group Plan, letting subscribers add extra members to their plans.

On January 17, 2018, Google Fi announced bill protection which caps the charge for data at $60. If the data used is greater than 15GB, then Fi may slow the data speed to 256kbit/s. The user can avoid the slowdown by paying full price for the data used at $10 per GB. Bill protection also works with group plans, with a maximum charge of $85 for two people, $120 for three people, and $140 for four people. The rate for unlimited calls and texting is not affected by bill protection.
Google Fi later dropped US Cellular, leaving T-Mobile as the only supported network in the US.

Features 
Google Fi automatically switches between networks depending on signal strength and speed. It can automatically connect to open Wi-Fi hotspots while securing data with encryption through an automatic VPN. Phone calls will seamlessly transition to a cellular network if Wi-Fi coverage is lost.

Google Fi users could originally use the now defunct Google Hangouts on any phone, tablet, or computer to call and text. Google Fi also supports VoLTE as part of a staged rollout.

Google Fi supports 5G and it automatically switches between different networks.

A data-only SIM card can be used on supported tablets, smartphones, and car modems (e.g., Volvo). A data-only sim will have access to data, but will not be able to make calls or transmit texts across cellular networks

In October 2021, Google Fi announced that it would be adding support for end-to-end encrypted calls.

Plans 
Monthly plans start at $20 per month and are flat fee–based, paid at the beginning of each monthly billing cycle. All plans include unlimited calls and messaging. Money for unused data is credited back to the user's account, while overuse of data results in a charge of $10 per gigabyte. When outside the United States, cellular phone calls cost $0.20 per minute, data costs the same $10 per gigabyte (i.e. there are no extra data charges outside of the US), and texting is free. Data is free at full speeds between 6 GB and 15 GB for the duration of the billing cycle with Bill Protection. After 15 GB, data continues to be free but will be throttled to unspecified speeds.  A data-only SIM card can be used on tablets and other compatible devices, including the 2013 Nexus 7, Nexus 9, and iPad Air 2. The devices must be compatible with the T-Mobile network, and users can add up to 4 data-only SIM cards in one account (before July 2019 the limit was 9 data-only SIM cards in one account).

A Group Plan, which allows users, referred to as "managers", to add other people, referred to as "members", to their subscription, costs an additional $15 per user. Group Plans let managers view data usage by member, set data notifications, add monthly allowances, and pause members' data usage.  In June 2017, Group Plans were updated to feature "Group Repay", in which Google Fi automatically calculates each of the members' individual shares of the bill and allows for easy payments. Such payments can be a fixed amount, an individual's total usage, or only for data usage above the standard data allotment.

Google Fi offers an 'Unlimited' Plan for its users for a flat rate of $70 per month with up to 50 GB of high speed data. After 50 GB, speeds are throttled to 256 kbit/s.
On both plans, users can pay an additional $10 per 1 GB until their next billing cycle. Fi's 'Unlimited' plan also includes 100 GB of Google One storage at no additional cost.  It is important to note that Google Fi does not honor promotions for current Google Fi customers.  This is not explained on promotional offers and many customers have noted that Google Fi has a history of assuring customers that promotional offers are valid, and the day after it expires, will email customers to let them know that they aren't eligible.

Devices

 LG G7 ThinQ
 LG V35 ThinQ
 LG V30S
 LG V30
 LG V20
 LG G6
 Moto X4 (Android One version)
 Moto G6
 Moto G7
 Moto G Stylus
 Moto G Power
 Nexus 6
 Nexus 5X
 Nexus 6P
 Pixel and Pixel XL
 Pixel 2 and Pixel 2 XL
 Pixel 3 and Pixel 3 XL
 Pixel 3a and Pixel 3a XL
 Pixel 4 and Pixel 4 XL
 Pixel 4a and Pixel 4a (5G)
 Pixel 5
 Pixel 5a
 Pixel 6 and Pixel 6 Pro
 Pixel 6a
 Pixel 7 and Pixel 7 Pro
 iPhone 5S and later (beta)
 iPhone 5C
 iPhone 5
 Samsung Galaxy S21
 Samsung Galaxy S20
 Samsung Galaxy Note20
 Samsung Galaxy A71
 Samsung Galaxy A32
 Other devices may work with data-only SIMs if they are unlocked and work with the T-Mobile GSM network. Google Fi may not be able to help activate or troubleshoot unlisted devices.

Reception 
Nicole Lee of Engadget praised the service's plans, writing that "In the course of six months, I've barely touched my monthly 2 GB data allotment and frequently receive money back each month from unused data. I found myself paying a little more than $20 a month for Fi, which is the least I've paid for a cell phone service, ever." Lee liked the service's transition between Wi-Fi and cellular data.

JR Raphael of Computerworld also praised the pricing strategy and network transitions. Raphael also wrote that "Fi's customer support is [...] actually a pretty good experience", elaborating that "if you need extra help, both interfaces offer the ability to get 24/7 support from a real person via phone or email."

See also 
 Google Fiber
Google Voice

References

External links 
 

Fi
Mobile virtual network operators